Solbat Park Station is a station on the Ui LRT located in Ui-dong, Gangbuk-gu, Seoul. It opened on 2 September 2017.

Station layout

Vicinity

Exit 1 : Dobong Public Library, Seoul Baegun Elementary School
Exit 2 : Solbat Neighborhood Park, Yeo Un-hyeong's Tomb, Sorabol Middle School

References

Seoul Metropolitan Subway stations
Railway stations opened in 2017
Metro stations in Gangbuk District